Natarajan Subramanian, better known as Natty, is an Indian cinematographer who has worked on Tamil films. He has also worked as an actor in Tamil films and achieved recognition through his performance as a conman in Sathuranga Vettai (2014).

Career
Born into a Tamil-speaking family, Natarajan pursued an interest in photography and quit school at 18, choosing to take up a series of odd jobs to fund his interest rather than going through college. He worked as a still photographer at weddings, and then performed as a videographer at ceremonies. He briefly assisted cinematographer B. R. Vijayalakshmi but was unable to get a break in the film industry, so chose to work on documentaries instead, before venturing into work on commercials and music videos. He shot videos of the music band Euphoria's first album, and his work was well received. He became acquainted with director Ram Gopal Varma and the pair discussed a film project which did not materialise, before he was recommended by Varma to Anurag Kashyap, whom he worked with for three Hindi projects - Last Train to Mahakali (1999), Paanch (2003), and Black Friday (2004). In between he had also worked for Tamil romantic-comedy Youth (2002) starring Vijay, and had briefly agreed to be a part of AR Murugadoss's Ramanaa (2001), which he later opted out from. Despite being active in Tamil films, he has chosen to prioritise work as a cinematographer in Hindi films, working on successful films including Jab We Met (2007), Golmaal Returns (2008), Raanjhanaa (2013) and Holiday: A Soldier Is Never Off Duty (2014).

Away from cinematography in big-budget Hindi films, Natarajan has embarked on an alternate career as an actor in small-budget Tamil films. He initially appeared in two films by his friend Uday Mahesh, Naalai (2006) and Chakkara Viyugam (2008), both of which went unnoticed at the box office but he won positive acclaim for his performance in Naalai. He starred in two further action-masala films aimed at the village and town audiences, Milaga (2010) and  Muthukku Muthaaga (2011),  which received similar lukewarm responses. In 2014, Natarajan featured in the Tamil caper film, Sathuranga Vettai directed by newcomer Vinoth and produced by Manobala. The film opened to positive reviews and became a surprise success at the box office, with a critic noting Natarajan "is brilliant as Gandhi Babu. He does his part with relish using his brains more than brawn with expressive body and eye language". However, his 2015 action film Katham Katham is not very impressive. Once again, Natty plays the good-man-turned-evil-mind, whose biggest weakness is spondulicks. His dialogue delivery is titch and screen presence, casual, on a believable act of bad cop. In 2017, he had three film releases including Enkitta Mothathe, Bongu and  Richie. In 2018, Natty was approached by the duo directors Hari and Harish for a thriller titled "Silk" which is supposed to be a Kanchipuram-based storyline, but the shooting has not yet been started. In Pandiraj's Namma Veettu Pillai (2019), he has a muscular presence, perfect for a character actor. He acted in the lead role in Sandimuni (2020) and Godfather (2020). He has played an important role in Sibi's cop drama Walter (2020), which was directed by U. Anbarasan. Natty experienced playing the ruthless cop Kannabiran in Mari Selvaraj in Karnan (2021). The film was Natty's second collaboration with Dhanush, the first being as the cinematographer of the latter's Hindi debut, Raanjhanaa.

Filmography

As actor

Web series

As cinematographer

References

External links
 

Living people
Tamil film cinematographers
Indian male film actors
Tamil male actors
People from Ramanathapuram district
Male actors from Tamil Nadu
Cinematographers from Tamil Nadu
21st-century Indian male actors
Male actors in Tamil cinema
1971 births